Aikaterini ("Katerina") Bliamou (born 15 October 1982 in Central Macedonia) is a former female backstroke and freestyle swimmer from Greece.

She won a bronze medal at the 2005 Mediterranean Games, and represented her native country at the 2000 Summer Olympics in Sydney, Australia.

References
 

1982 births
Living people
Greek female swimmers
People from Emmanouil Pappas
Olympic swimmers of Greece
Swimmers at the 2000 Summer Olympics
Female backstroke swimmers
Mediterranean Games bronze medalists for Greece
Swimmers at the 2005 Mediterranean Games
Mediterranean Games medalists in swimming
Sportspeople from Central Macedonia